Allison Jones (born 1955) is an American casting director who is credited for helping bring together realistic ensemble casts for such popular television shows as The Fresh Prince of Bel-Air (1990–1996), Freaks and Geeks (1999–2000), Curb Your Enthusiasm (2000–), Undeclared (2001–2002), Arrested Development (2003–2006), the American version of The Office (2005–2013), United States of Tara (2009–2011), Parks and Recreation (2009–2015), Brooklyn Nine-Nine (2013–2021), The Good Place (2016–2020), and What We Do in the Shadows (2019–).

Early life and education 
Jones grew-up in Needham, Massachusetts. She was the second youngest child in a family with six children.

Jones graduated from Pomona College in 1977, with a degree in visual arts. During her time at Pomona, she cultivated an appreciation for what she called "pure geek existence" as her friends introduced her to Monty Python, The Firesign Theatre, and Saturday Night Live.

Career 
Jones has worked as a casting director in the entertainment business since 1982, with her first credited work for the television show being Family Ties and later in 1985, The Golden Girls.

Jones has cast popular television shows including Freaks and Geeks (for which she won an Emmy), Undeclared, The Fresh Prince of Bel-Air, Veep, What We Do in the Shadows, Our Flag Means Death, Parks and Recreation, Brooklyn Nine-Nine, The Good Place, Curb Your Enthusiasm, United States of Tara, Arrested Development (both of which she was also nominated for), and the US version of The Office.

She has also cast a number of successful films, including The 40-Year-Old Virgin (2005), Borat: Cultural Learnings of America for Make Benefit Glorious Nation of Kazakhstan (2006). Knocked Up (2007); The Dictator (2012), and Booksmart (2019). Jones also received casting credit for Talladega Nights: The Ballad of Ricky Bobby (2006), Hot Rod, Superbad (both 2007), Step Brothers (2008), Brüno (2009), Scott Pilgrim vs. the World (2010), Bridesmaids, Fright Night (both 2011), Ghostbusters (2016), and Lady Bird (2017). 

In 2015, her work as a casting director included the comedy film Get Hard; the Yahoo! Screen show Other Space, and the Netflix series Master of None.

References

External links
 

1955 births
American casting directors
Women casting directors
Living people
People from Needham, Massachusetts
Pomona College alumni
Primetime Emmy Award winners